The Bacon and Tomlin, Inc. is a historic site in Sarasota, Florida, United States. The building was located at 201 South Palm Avenue. On March 22, 1984, it was added to the U.S. National Register of Historic Places.

The house was built sometime before 1925 and served as the real estate and insurance office of Bacon and Tomlin, Inc.

References

External links
 Sarasota County listings at National Register of Historic Places
 Bacon and Tomlin, Inc. at Portal of Historic Resources, State of Florida

National Register of Historic Places in Sarasota County, Florida
Buildings and structures in Sarasota, Florida